Propadiene or allene is the organic compound with the formula .  It is the simplest allene, i.e. a compound with two adjacent carbon double bonds. As a constituent of MAPP gas, it has been used as a fuel for specialized welding.

Production and equilibrium with methylacetylene
Allene exists in equilibrium with methylacetylene (propyne) and the mixture is sometimes called MAPD for methylacetylene-propadiene:
H3CC#CH <<=> H2C=C=CH2

MAPD is produced as a side product, often an undesirable one, of dehydrogenation of propane to produce propene, an important feedstock in the chemical industry.  MAPD interferes with the catalytic polymerization of propene.

References

Fuel gas
Alkadienes